The 1961 Individual Speedway World Championship was the 16th edition of the official World Championship to determine the world champion rider.

The final was held outside of Wembley and England for the first time when on the 15 September Ove Fundin retained his title in his home country of Sweden. It was the first time a rider had won three titles and Sweden produced a clean sweep of podium places with Björn Knutsson and Göte Nordin finishing second and third.

First round
British & Commonwealth Qualifying - 32 riders to British & Commonwealth semi finals
Scandinavian Qualifying - 16 to Nordic Final
Continental Qualifying - 16 to Continental Final

British & Commonwealth Qualifying

Scandinavian Qualifying

Continental Qualifying

Second round
British & Commonwealth semi finals - 16 to British & Commonwealth final
Scandinavian Final - 8 to European Final
Continental Final - 8 to European Final

British & Commonwealth Semi finals

Nordic  Final
11 June 1961
 Gislaved
 First 8 to European Final

Continental Final
 23 July 1961
 Slany
 First 8 to European Final

Third round
British & Commonwealth Final - 8 to World Final
European Final - 8 to World Final

European Final
26 August 1961
 Wieden
 First 8 to World Final plus 1 reserve

British  Final
2 September 1961
 Wembley
 First 8 to World final plus 1 reserve

World Final
15 September 1961
 Malmö, Malmö Stadion

References

1961
World Individual
1961 in Swedish motorsport
Speedway competitions in Sweden